"Two Little Dickie Birds" or "Two Little Black Birds" is an English language nursery rhyme and fingerplay. It has a Roud Folk Song Index number of 16401.

Lyrics
Modern versions of the rhyme include:

Two little dickie birds sitting on a wall.
One named Peter, one named Paul.
Fly away, Peter! Fly away, Paul!
Come back, Peter! Come back, Paul!

Origins
The rhyme was first recorded when published in Mother Goose's Melody in London around 1765. In this version the names of the birds were Jack and Gill:

There were two blackbirds
Sat upon a hill,
The one was nam'd Jack,
The other nam'd Gill;
Fly away Jack,
Fly away Gill,
Come again Jack,
Come again Gill.

These names seem to have been replaced with the apostles Peter and Paul in the 19th century.

Variants 
In American English, the variant "Two Little Blackbirds" is more common.
Two little blackbirds sitting on a hill.
One named Jack and one named Jill.
Fly away Jack, fly away Jill.
Come back Jack, come back Jill.

Two little blackbirds flying in the sky.
One named Low and one named High.
Fly away Low, fly away High.
Come back Low, come back High.

Two little blackbirds sitting on a pole.
One named Fast and one named Slow.
Fly away Fast, fly away Slow.
Come back Fast, come back Slow.

Two little blackbirds sitting on a gate.
One named Early and one named Late.
Fly away Early, fly away Late.
Come back Early, come back Late.

Hand actions
The adult, out of sight of the child, will mark in some conspicuous way the nail of the index finger of one hand and the nail of the second finger of the other hand. Both hands are then shown to the child as fists (folded fingers downwards) with the two fingers with marked nails pointing forward – these represent Peter and Paul. As the rhyme is recited, the hand actions are:

References

Finger plays
English nursery rhymes
English folk songs
English children's songs
Traditional children's songs
Fictional birds
Fictional duos
Songs about birds